The Java Formation is a geologic formation in Kentucky, New York, Ohio, Pennsylvania, Tennessee, Virginia, West Virginia. It preserves fossils dating back to the Devonian period. The formation comprises the Pipe Creek Shale, Wiscoy Sandstone Member in New York, and Hanover Shale Member except in Tennessee.

See also

 List of fossiliferous stratigraphic units in Pennsylvania
 Paleontology in Pennsylvania

References

Devonian geology of Pennsylvania
Devonian southern paleotemperate deposits
Devonian geology of New York (state)